Butia is a genus of palms in the family Arecaceae, native to the South American countries of Brazil, Paraguay, Uruguay and Argentina. Many species produce edible fruits, which are sometimes used to make alcoholic beverages and other foods. The name is derived from a Brazilian vernacular word for members of the genus.

Description
These are 'feather palms', having pinnate leaves up to 3m long including petiole which usually have a distinct downward arch. The species vary from nearly stemless plants rarely exceeding 40 cm tall (e.g. Butia campicola) to small trees up to 12m tall (e.g. B. yatay).

Butia odorata is notable as one of the hardiest feather palms, tolerating temperatures down to about −10 °C; it is widely cultivated in warm temperate to subtropical regions.

Species
Accepted species:

No longer accepted species:
 Butia missionera Deble & Marchiori - Rio Grande do Sul
 Butia noblickii Deble - Corrientes Province of Argentina
 Butia quaraimana Deble & Marchiori - Rio Grande do Sul
 Butia stolonifera (Barb.Rodr.) Becc. - Uruguay

New species:
 Butia poni (Haum.) Burret - Misiones Province of Argentina
 Butia sp. nov. - Mato Grosso do Sul

Intergeneric hybrids
 × Butyagrus alegretensis K. Soares (B. lallemantii × Syagrus romanzoffiana)
 × Butyagrus nabonnandii (Prosch.) Vorster (B. odorata × S. romanzoffiana)

References

 Royal Botanic Gardens, Kew palm checklist: Butia
 PACSOA: Butia

 
Arecaceae genera
Flora of South America
Taxa named by Odoardo Beccari
Edible palms